The Vanishing Investigator is a 1983 role-playing game adventure for Gangbusters published by TSR.

Contents
The Vanishing Investigator is a mystery adventure in which the player characters are part of a task force involved in the search for a senator who disappeared shortly before his Senate Committee on Organized Crime was to start hearings.

Reception
Jerry Epperson reviewed The Vanishing Investigator in Space Gamer No. 70. Epperson commented that "If you are looking for a well-executed mystery, this one has all the elements, but is more of a guided tour than a 'whodunit.' Some will be disappointed by this; I was. That's why Vanishing Investigator gets only a qualified recommendation. With a little more work, this could have been really good."

Reviews
Dragon #91 (Nov., 1984)

References

Role-playing game adventures
Role-playing game supplements introduced in 1983